Godfey Kirumira, also known as Godfrey Kirumira Kalule, is a Ugandan businessman. According to a 2012 published report, he is one of the wealthiest people in Uganda.

Business interests
Kirumira's Bargary Company Limited deals in fuel. It controls twelve petrol stations inside and outside Kampala under the brand name Gelp. He also has interests in real estate, general merchandise, import/export, and private security. Another company he owns is Nabugabo Updeal Venture Limited. His businesses are organized in the Godfrey Kirumira Kalule Group or GKK Group of Companies, of which Kirumira is the chairman.

Other responsibilities
Kirumira is the chairman of Kwagalana Group, a club of the wealthiest tycoons in Uganda and founded in 2002.

Net worth
According to the New Vision newspaper, Kirumira had a net worth of about US$30 million in 2012.

See also
List of wealthiest people in Uganda

References

External links
 Tycoon Godfrey Kirumira Also Acquires A Brand New ‘Lexus LX570 2016’ Model

Ugandan businesspeople
Living people
People from Kampala District
Ganda people
Year of birth missing (living people)
Ugandan businesspeople in real estate